Tarik Johnston (born 12 April 1988), commonly known as Rvssian (formerly spelled as Russian), is a Jamaican record producer, singer, songwriter and entrepreneur. Rvssian is the founder of Head Concussion, a music production company situated in Kingston, Jamaica.

Rvssian rose to popularity shortly after producing Vybz Kartel's "Life Sweet" in 2010. He followed up with "Straight Jeans and Fitted" (a collaboration with Vybz Kartel), "Pull Up To Mi Bumper" (featuring Konshens and J Capri) and "Passion Whine" (featuring Sean Paul and Puerto Rican singer Farruko), a single which was certified platinum by the Recording Industry Association of America (RIAA) on October 3, 2014.

Early life 
Tarik  'Rvssian'  Johnston who is from a musical family in Jamaica has had an interest in music from an early age, learning to play the piano and drums from his father Michael 'Micron' Johnston, the founder of Micron Music Limited. In December 2007, Rvssian decided to set up Head Concussion Records, a music production studio located in Kingston, Jamaica.

After graduating from Ardenne High School, Rvssian enrolled in the Edna Manley College of the Visual and Performing Arts. It was during this period that he met Vybz Kartel through fellow producers Jordan McClure (Chimney Records) and Stephen 'Di Genius' McGregor.
In 2008, Rvssian created his first rhythm "Liberty Riddim", which featured Konshens' "Ago Kill Me" and Vybz Kartel's "Nah Hold We Down".

Two years later, Rvssian produced "Life Sweet" for Vybz Kartel. To develop his music career further, Rvssian decided to leave the Edna Manley College for Visual and Performing Arts.

Working with Vybz Kartel 
In the wake of 2010, Rvssian and Vybz Kartel teamed up on the single "Straight Jeans and Fitted." The song received over 25 million views on YouTube and went on to win "Favorite Music Collaboration" in the February 2011 Youth View Awards.

In 2010, rumors of a dispute between Rvssian and Vybz Kartel surfaced but the two artistes were quick to dispel the reports.

The duo also worked together on "Get Gyal Anywhere", "Cure Fi Badmind", "Look Pon We" and "New Jordans" (feat. Rvssian). The latter, released in 2014 was recorded before Vybz Kartel went to prison.

The two have since continued to work together and Rvssian has released a series of singles by Vybz Kartel including "Ever Blessed", "Kremlin", "Hi" and "Mamacita" (featuring J Capri), all released after Kartel's incarceration.

Head Concussion Records 
Shortly after forming Head Concussion Records in December 2007, Rvssian released a number of songs, working with notable dancehall acts like Demarco, Tarrus Riley and Blak Ryno. He released Kartel's hit single "Life Sweet", which was followed by dancehall rhythms such as "Go Go Club", "Remedy" and "Nuh Fear". These rhythms became hits, with the "Go Go Club" rhythm introducing new artistes like Merital Family to the musical scene.

Under his label Head Concussion Records, Rvssian went on to release Tarrus Riley's hit single "Good Girl, Gone Bad" which featured Konshens, Vybz Kartel's "Lyricist" and Chan Dizzy's "Nuh Strange Face." Rvssian established his singing skills after teaming up with Vybz Kartel on various hit singles like "Straight Jeans and Fitted", Cure Fi Badmind", "Look Pon We", "Yellow Yellow" and "New Jordans".

After the arrest and conviction of Vybz Kartel, Rvssian, whose career growth had been attributed to working with the "Dancehall Hero", kept Head Concussion Records on the global map, launching J Capri, a new female dancehall artiste. The platinum-selling producer released "Pull Up To Mi Bumper" (featuring Konshens and J Capri), "Whine 'n' Kotch" (featuring J Capri and Charly Black), "Reverse It" and "Boom 'n" Bend Over" by J Capri. J Capri's "Pull Up To Mi Bumper" and "Whine 'n' Kotch" received over 25 and 50 million YouTube views, respectively.

Awards and recognition 
At the Youth View Awards in February 2011, Rvssian won the award for Favorite Local Music Video for the Year alongside Vybz Kartel for their hit single "Straight Jeans and Fitted". Rvssian also won Favorite Producer at the 2015 YVA Awards.

In 2014, Rvssian won a platinum plaque for his reggaeton single "Passion Whine". He was also recognized at the 21st Digital Awards for his musical contributions.

References 

Living people
Jamaican  male songwriters
Jamaican pianists
Jamaican drummers
Male drummers
Jamaican guitarists
Male guitarists
Male pianists
21st-century pianists
21st-century Jamaican male singers
1988 births
Trap musicians
Jamaican dancehall musicians
Latin trap musicians
Reggaeton musicians